Igor Sergeevich Ulanov (born 1 October 1969) is a Russian former professional ice hockey defenceman who played 14 seasons in the National Hockey League (NHL). Ulanov was drafted by the Winnipeg Jets in the tenth round of the 1991 NHL Entry Draft.

Playing career

He has played for the Jets, Washington Capitals, Chicago Blackhawks, Tampa Bay Lightning, Montreal Canadiens, Edmonton Oilers, New York Rangers and the Florida Panthers, as well as European and American Hockey League clubs.

At the 2002 trade deadline, he was part of a package sent to the Florida Panthers for Pavel Bure. Ulanov returned to Edmonton for the 2003–04 season and remained a member of the Oilers through the 2005–06 season. Ulanov has also represented Russia at the 1994 World Championships and the 1996 World Cup of Hockey. He was playing for Lokomotiv Yaroslavl of the Russian Super League, until late January 2008. He then signed with HC Dinamo Minsk of the Kontinental Hockey League.

Career statistics

Regular season and playoffs

International

Transactions
17 October 1995 – Washington traded Ulanov to Chicago 3rd round draft pick in the 1996 NHL Entry Draft.
20 March 1996 – Chicago trades Ulanov, Patrick Poulin and a 2nd round pick in the 1996 NHL Entry Draft to Tampa Bay for Enrico Ciccone and a 2nd round pick in the same draft.
15 January 1998 – Tampa Bay trades Ulanov, Mick Vukota and Patrick Poulin to Montreal for Darcy Tucker, David Wilkie and Stéphane Richer.
9 March 2000 – Montreal trades Ulanov and Alain Nasreddine to Edmonton for Christian Laflamme and Matthieu Descoteaux.
20 July 2001 – Ulanov signs with New York as a free agent.
18 March 2002 – New York Rangers trade Ulanov, Filip Novák, a 1st round pick and 2nd round pick in the 2002 NHL Entry Draft, and a 4th round pick in the 2003 NHL Entry Draft to Florida for Pavel Bure and a 2nd round pick in the 2002 NHL Entry Draft.

External links

1969 births
Living people
Chicago Blackhawks players
Edmonton Oilers players
Florida Panthers players
Fort Wayne Komets players
Hartford Wolf Pack players
HC Dinamo Minsk players
HC Khimik Voskresensk players
Indianapolis Ice players
Lokomotiv Yaroslavl players
Moncton Hawks players
Montreal Canadiens players
New York Rangers players
People from Krasnokamsk
Russian ice hockey defencemen
San Antonio Rampage players
Soviet ice hockey defencemen
Tampa Bay Lightning players
Toronto Roadrunners players
Washington Capitals players
Winnipeg Jets (1979–1996) draft picks
Winnipeg Jets (1979–1996) players
Sportspeople from Perm Krai